The gens Heia was a Roman family at Messana, which appears in history during the final century of the Republic.  They were part of the ancient nobility of the city, and at some time became hereditary clientes of the Claudian gens.

Members
 Gnaeus Heius, one of the judges of the Judicium Albianum, the court that tried Oppianicus in 74 BC.
 Heius, a Lilybaean, and a ward of Gaius Claudius Pulcher.  The praetor Verres used his position to despoil Heius of his money and works of art.
 Gaius Heius, led a deputation of citizens from Messana who were brought to Rome in order to testify on behalf of Verres, during his trial in BC 70.  Instead, Heius described for the prosecution how Verres had seized numerous artworks belonging to his family, including outstanding works of Greek sculpture.
 Gaius Heius Primus, Flamen Augustalis at Olisipo in the time of Nero, provided the orchestra for the theatre of that city.
 Marcus Heius, prefect or governor of Egypt between AD 42 and 45.

See also
 List of Roman gentes

References

Bibliography
 Marcus Tullius Cicero, In Verrem, Pro Cluentio.
 Dictionary of Greek and Roman Biography and Mythology, William Smith, ed., Little, Brown and Company, Boston (1849).
 Corpus Inscriptionum Latinarum.
 Frank Sear, Roman Theatres: an Architectural Study, Oxford University Press (2006).

Roman gentes